Onésimo Rufino (born 7 June 1947) is a Dominican Republic wrestler. He competed in the men's freestyle 63 kg at the 1968 Summer Olympics.

References

External links
 

1947 births
Living people
Dominican Republic male sport wrestlers
Olympic wrestlers of the Dominican Republic
Wrestlers at the 1968 Summer Olympics
People from Santiago de los Caballeros